Gentleman Auction House is an American indie rock band from St. Louis, Missouri, currently signed to Emergency Umbrella Records.  The band was formed in 2005 as a way for lead singer Eric Enger to record and perform his songs.  The band consists of Enger, Steve Kozel, Kiley Kozel, Eric Herbst, Ryan Adams, and Stephen Tomko. Gentleman Auction House was named "Best Indie Band" in 2009 by the Riverfront Times.

The band has toured the United States and has played several festivals including Diversafest, South by Southwest, Pygmalion Music Festival, and the CMJ Music Marathon, and has been featured on Fearless Music TV  and Daytrotter.

Discography
 The Rules Were Handed Down (2006, self-released)
 The Book Of Matches EP (2008, Emergency Umbrella Records)
 Alphabet Graveyard (2008, Emergency Umbrella Records)
 Christmas In Love (2008, Emergency Umbrella Records)

References

External links

 Gentleman Auction House at Emergency Umbrella Records

Indie rock musical groups from Missouri
Musical groups from St. Louis
Musical groups established in 2005